Abashidze is a Georgian surname.

Notable people with the name 
Anna Abashidze (1730–1749), Georgian princess
Aslan Abashidze, Georgian politician, separatist leader in the Ajarian Autonomous Republic in western Georgia
Giorgi-Malakia Abashidze,  Georgian nobleman, became king George VI of Imereti
Grigol Abashidze, Georgian poet 
Haidar Abashidze, Georgian politician, journalist, and educator
Irakli Abashidze, Georgian poet, literary scholar and politician
Ivane Abashidze, Georgian nobleman, one of the leaders of the 1819 Imeretian Uprising, claimant to the throne of Imereti
Kita Abashidze, Georgian literary critic, journalist, and politician
Levan Abashidze (died 1757), Georgian prince, maternal grandfather of Solomon I of Imereti
Levan Abashidze (1963–1992), Georgian film actor
Memed Abashidze, Georgian politician, writer and public benefactor
Nunu Abashydze, Ukrainian athlete, bronze medalist for the Soviet Union in 1982 European Athletics Championships
Vaso Abashidze, Georgian theater actor and a founder of a realistic acting tradition in Georgia

See also 
 Abashidze, a Georgian princely family

Georgian-language surnames